Marcus Diadochus (Markos ho diadochos) was a Christian writer of the fourth century. Nothing is known of him but his name at the head of a "Sermon against the Arians", discovered by Wetsten in a manuscript codex of St. Athanasius at Basle and published by him at the end of his edition of Origen Another version of the same work was lent by Galliciollus to Galland and published in the "Veterum Patrum Bibliotheca", V (Venice, 1765–1781). This is the text in Patrologia Graeca The sermon quotes and expounds the usual texts, and answers difficulties.

A quite different person is Diadochus, Bishop of Photike in Epirus in the fifth century, author of a "Sermon on the Ascension" and of a hundred "Chapters on Spiritual Perfection", whom Victor Vitensis praises in the prologue of his history of the Vandal persecution. The two are often confounded, as Migne does.

References
 Patrologia Graeca LXV. 1141–1212;
 JUNGMANN-FESSLER, Institutiones Patrologiae (Innsbruck, 1896), IIb, 147–148;
 CHEVALIER, bio-Bibl., s.v.

Notes

External links
 Catholic Encyclopedia article

4th-century writers
Church Fathers